Senator John Kerry the frontrunner for the nomination yet again won by a landslide. Third place finisher Howard Dean 2 and a half weeks ago was leading former army general Wesley Clark 16% to 18%. Kerry got the endorsement of Lieutenant Governor of New Mexico Diane D. Denish. Wesley Clark got the most endorsements out of anyone. He got Mayor of Santa Fe Larry Delgado, candidate for offices Roberto A. Mondragon, congressional candidate Richard Romero and the Albuquerque Tribune. Governor Howard Dean got an endorsement from a former senator Fred Harris and former governor Toney Anaya. Joe Lieberman yet again faced another disappointing showing in the primaries.

Results

2004 New Mexico elections
New Mexico
New Mexico Democratic primaries